John Best (11 July 1861 in Geelong, Australia – 7 June 1923) was an Australian-born politician in Canada. He was acclaimed to the House of Commons of Canada, after the death of his predecessor John Barr, on 22 December 1909, as a member of the Conservative Party to represent the riding of Dufferin. He was re-elected in the 1911 election and was re-elected as a Unionist in 1917 then defeated in the 1921 election as a Conservative.

References

External links
 

1861 births
1923 deaths
Australian emigrants to Canada
Conservative Party of Canada (1867–1942) MPs
Members of the House of Commons of Canada from Ontario